Mills Building may refer to:

Mills Building (San Diego)
Mills Building (San Francisco)
Mills Building (New York City)
Anson Mills Building, El Paso, Texas
Mills Building, historic building at South Carolina State Hospital
Mills Building (Longview, Washington), listed on the NRHP in Cowlitz County, Washington